Ugory may refer to the following places:
Ugory, Greater Poland Voivodeship (west-central Poland)
Ugory, Lublin Voivodeship (east Poland)
Ugory, West Pomeranian Voivodeship (north-west Poland)